The election of Members of Parliament (MPs) to the 7th Parliament of the Fourth Republic was held on 7 December 2016.  The Speaker is not an elected member of parliament though he/she is qualified to stand for election as such. There are a total of 275 constituencies in Ghana. 45 new constituencies were created prior to the 2012 election. The 7th Parliament had its first sitting on Sunday 7 January 2017 shortly after midnight to elect a Speaker and Deputy Speakers as well as for the administration of oaths to the Speaker and Members of Parliament.

Current composition
Results from 275 constituencies are shown in the table below.

List of MPs elected in the general election
 



Changes
 Emmanuel Kyeremateng Agyarko, MP for Ayawaso West Wuogon in the Greater Accra Region died in the United States where he had been receiving medical treatment on 21 November 2018.
December 2018 - A referendum was conducted on 27 December 2018 on the creation of six new regions. All the new regions were approved. The Brong-Ahafo region was split into three, adding the Bono and the Bono East regions. The Northern Region was also split into three, the new additions being Savannah Region and North East Region. The Oti Region was carved out of the Volta Region and the Western Region was split into Western and Western North Region respectively.
 - Mfantseman - 9 October 2020: The incumbent MP, Ekow Hayford of the NPP was murdered by armed robbers on the Nkusukum Mankessim-Abeadze Duadze Road on his way from a campaign trip. As his death is less than three months before the 2020 Ghanaian general election, Article 112 (5) of the 1992 Ghanaian Constitution stipulates that there shouldl not be a by-election in the constituency.
 - Fomena - Following the decision of the standing MP, Andrew Amoako Asiamah to stand as an independent candidate in the 2020 Ghanaian general election, the NPP which he had left, petitioned the Speaker of Parliament to expel him as by registering as an independent candidate, the party no more recognised him as a member. Mike Oquaye subsequently ruled that his seat had become vacant in line with Article 97(1)(g) of the constitution.

By-elections
 Ayawaso West - 31 January 2019 - Following the death of Emmanuel Agyarko of the New Patriotic Party (NPP), the Electoral Commission of Ghana conducted a by-election. This was contested by four parties. The National Democratic Congress (NDC) declared on the eve of the election that they were withdrawing their candidate due to some reported violence. The election was won by one of the wives of the deceased former MP, Lydia Seyram Alhassan of the NPP with 68.8% of the votes. Kwasi Delali Brempong of the NDC, whose name was still on the ballot was the runner up with 30.52% of the votes. William Kofi Dowokpor of the Progressive People's Party had 0.58% while Clement Boadi of the Liberal Party of Ghana had 0.1% of the total votes cast.
 Mfantseman - As the death of the sitting MP, Ekow Hayford was less than 3 months before the 2020 Ghanaian general election, no by-election was arranged as stipulated by the Ghanaian Constitution.

Notes
 The largest winning majority in the 2016 election of 58,084 was by Francisca Oteng-Mensah of the NPP in the Kwabre East constituency of the Ashanti Region. The other constituencies with majorities greater than 50,000 are all in the Ashanti Region. They are Kwadaso where Samiu Kwadwo Nuamah of the NPP had a margin of 55,386 and Suame where Osei Kyei Mensah Bonsu also of the NPP had a winning majority of 54,443.
 The smallest winning majority of just 12 votes was by Kofi Essuah Michael Stephen Ackah of the NDC in the Suaman constituency in the Western Region. Since the creation of new regions in December 2018, it is now located within the Western North Region. Other constituencies with very small winning margins are Salaga South, Savannah Reigon where Salifu Adam Braimah of NPP  had 47, Krachi East, Oti Region, Michael Yaw Gyato of NPP, 47, Pru West, Bono East Region, Masawud Mohammed, NDC, 42 and Tain, Bono Region, where Gabriel Osei, NPP had a winning majority of 41.
 Linda Obenewaa Akweley Ocloo, MP for Shai-Osudoku constituency only stood for election in 2016 because her husband, who was the designated NDC parliamentary candidate, died prior to the election. The MP for Ayawaso West, Emmanuel Agyarko also died during the lifetime of this parliament and was replaced by his wife, Lydia Alhassan in the subsequent by-election.
 Francisca Oteng-Mensah, MP for Kwabre East was reportedly the youngest member of parliament. She entered parliament at the age of 23 years.
 A total of 11 members decided to retire from parliament and not contest the 2020 general election. Those from the NPP who retired were Anthony Akoto Osei, MP for Tafo Pankrono, Kwabena Appiah-Pinkrah, MP for Akrofuom, Ziblim Iddi MP for Gushegu and Shirley Ayorkor Botchwey MP for Anyaa Sowutuom. The 7 from the NDC who retired were Alban Bagbin, MP for Nadowli, Richard Quashigah, MP for Keta, Inusah Fuseini, Tamale Central, Bernice Adiku Heloo, Hohoe, Magnus Kofi Amoatey, Yilo Krobo, Clement Kofi Humado, Anlo and Fiifi Kwetey for Ketu South. In addition, 41 NPP MPs and 8 NDC MPs also lost out in the primaries.

See also
List of female members of the Seventh Parliament of the Fourth Republic of Ghana
2016 Ghanaian general election
Parliament of Ghana
Mike Oquaye - Speaker of the 7th Parliament of the 4th Republic.

References

External links and sources
Electoral Commission of Ghana - Detailed Parliamentary Election Results - Date of Election : 7th & 8th December 2016
 Election Passport - David Dublin, American University
Parliamentary Results For Elections 2016 on Ghanaweb
All 2016 - 2020 (7th Parliament) MPs - Alphabetical List of 2016 - 2020 (7th Parliament) MPs

2016
Ghanaian parliamentary election MPs elected